Codonanthopsis erubescens is a species of flowering plant in the family Gesneriaceae. This species is native to Ecuador and mainly grows in wet tropical biomes. Codonanthopsis erubescens was first published in 2013.

References

Flora of Ecuador
Plants described in 2013
Gesnerioideae